Sukhmeet Singh is an Indian rower and an Indian Army Junior commissioner officer . He won the gold medal in the 2018 Asian Games in Men's Quadruple sculls. He was born on 9 August 1994 at Kishangarh Pharwahi district Mansa (Punjab).

References

Indian male rowers
Asian Games medalists in rowing
Rowers at the 2018 Asian Games
Medalists at the 2018 Asian Games
Asian Games gold medalists for India
Living people
1994 births